Halnaker is a hamlet in the Chichester district of West Sussex, England. It lies on the A285 road 3.5 miles (5.6 km) northeast of Chichester, where it follows the line of the Roman road to London called Stane Street. There is a pub, The Anglesey Arms. Goodwood House is southwest of the village. North of the village Halnaker Windmill stands on 128 metre/420 feet high Halnaker Hill, a southern outpost of the South Downs. It is in the civil parish of Boxgrove.

History
Halnaker is mentioned in the Domesday Book under the Hundred of Boxgrove, Sussex, as having 44 households in the lands belonging to Earl Roger. The book which was written in 1086 said:

The place was in medieval times also referred to as Halfnaked. Kelly's Directory of 1867 says that Boxgrove manor-house

Further reading
Halnaker (Boxgrove), Victoria County History, Vol. 4 (Sussex), London, 1953

References

External links

Villages in West Sussex